Taking Lives is a 2004 American psychological thriller film directed by D. J. Caruso and starring Angelina Jolie and Ethan Hawke, with supporting roles by Kiefer Sutherland, Olivier Martinez, Tchéky Karyo, Jean-Hugues Anglade, and Gena Rowlands. Loosely adapted from the novel of the same name by Michael Pye, the film centers on an enigmatic serial killer who takes on the identities of his victims.

The film was shot on-location in Montréal and Quebec City, Quebec. The original music score was composed by Philip Glass and the main title's theme was composed by Walter Werzowa  of the electronica group Edelweiss.

The film was released in the United States on March 19, 2004 by Warner Bros. Pictures. It received negative reviews.

Plot
In the early 1980s, teenagers Martin Asher and Matt Soulsby meet on a bus to Mont-Laurier, Quebec. The bus breaks down, and the two acquire a car, which soon blows a tire. As Matt changes the tire, Martin comments that they are about the same height, and kicks him into the path of an oncoming truck, killing Matt and the driver. Taking Matt's guitar and clothes, Martin continues on foot, singing in a voice similar to Matt's.

Twenty years later, FBI profiler Illeana Scott is summoned by Inspector Leclair to help Montreal authorities in apprehending a serial killer who assumes his victims’ identities, enabling him to travel undetected across North America. Illeana interviews art dealer James Costa, an eyewitness to the killer’s most recent murder. James makes a drawing of the killer and the authorities track down the suspect's apartment, finding a decaying corpse chained in the ceiling. Martin's mother Rebecca claims to have seen her son – believed dead in Matt’s place years earlier – alive on a ferry to Quebec City, leading to the body buried as Martin being exhumed for forensic examination, and he becomes the primary suspect. At Rebecca's home, Illeana questions her about her son, learning that Martin was an unwanted child who became unstable after the death of his favored twin brother. Illeana discovers a hidden passageway behind a cabinet leading to Martin’s secret room, where she is attacked by a hidden assailant, who escapes before she can identify him.

Illeana deduces that Asher targets his victims to live as someone different than himself, and that his latest target is James after his apartment is ransacked. James is used in a sting operation to lure Asher, but the trap fails. During a show at his gallery, James is attacked by an assailant, presumed to be Asher, whom Illeana tries to apprehend but loses in the crowd. The police prepare to move James out of town, but he is confronted by the assailant, who attacks him and kills his police escort before driving away with James at gunpoint. Illeana gives chase, and causes the car to crash and explode just as James manages to escape.

James visits Illeana’s hotel room where, having grown close over the course of the investigation, they make passionate love surrounded by gruesome crime scene photos. Illeana awakens to find herself covered in James’ blood, but he has merely popped the stitches he received after the car chase.

As James’ stitches are repaired in the hospital, Illeana is called to the morgue, where Rebecca is unable to identify the charred body of the assailant, and Illeana realizes that Asher must still be alive. Before Illeana can reach her, Rebecca enters the elevator and is confronted by James, revealing himself as the real Martin Asher. He kills his mother, and Illeana is shocked to see him covered in blood before the elevator doors close again, and he escapes the hospital. The police determine that the assailant killed in the car chase was Christopher Hart, a drug addict and art thief to whom Asher owed money. In the struggle in his apartment, Asher killed Hart and staged being taken hostage. Pursued by the police, Asher escapes by train and selects his next victim, taunting Illeana by phone before disappearing. Admitting to having consensual sex with Asher, Illeana is fired from the FBI.

Seven months later, Illeana is living alone in a desolate farmhouse in Carlisle, Pennsylvania, apparently heavily pregnant with Asher's twins. She is confronted by Asher, who declares that they can start over and live together as a family, but Illeana refuses. Enraged, Asher beats her and prepares to choke her into unconsciousness, seizing a pair of scissors from her when she defends herself and stabbing her in the belly. Illeana stabs Asher in the heart with the same scissors and removes her prosthetic pregnant belly, explaining that the past months were a carefully planned trap. Asher dies, and Illeana informs Leclair the ordeal is over.

Cast

Story and writing credit
The film is based on the novel of the same title by Michael Pye. Numerous hands had a part in the screenplay as script doctors. The cover page of the screenplay credits Jon Bokenkamp with the original draft, Nicholas Kazan with subsequent revisions, Hilary Seitz with more revisions, and David Ayer with the last revisions (to February 28, 2003). The WGA screenwriting credit system ultimately awarded screenplay and adaptation credit to Bokenkamp alone.

Production
On April 3, 2001, it was announced that Jennifer Lopez is in negotiations to star in the film, with Tony Scott attached to direct. On September 19, 2002, it was reported that Angelina Jolie and Ethan Hawke are in talks to topline the thriller. Before Jolie was circling the project, Cate Blanchett and Gwyneth Paltrow were approached to play the part. On May 9, 2003, Kiefer Sutherland joined the cast, with D. J. Caruso confirmed to helm the film. On May 21, 2003, Olivier Martinez joined the film, Gena Rowlands being also cast in an unspecified role. Principal photography began later that month in Montreal.

Reception

Critical response
The film has received mostly poor reviews; Rotten Tomatoes gives the film a score of 22% based on reviews from 157 critics. The site's consensus states: "A stylish, but predictable thriller where the only thrills are offered by the sensuous Angelina Jolie." 
Film critic Roger Ebert gave it three out of four stars, describing it as "an effective thriller, on its modest but stylish level". Total Film, a UK film magazine, gave it two stars out of five with the verdict: "Starting off well but rapidly losing its way, Taking Lives is more serial-killer flick than serial killer -- we've been fed this mush a thousand times."

Angelina Jolie earned a Razzie Award nomination for Worst Actress for her performance in the movie (also for Alexander), but lost the trophy to Halle Berry for Catwoman.

Ethan Hawke called the film "terrible".

Box office
Taking Lives grossed $32,682,342 in the United States and $65,470,529 worldwide.

References

External links
 
 

2004 films
2004 crime thriller films
2004 psychological thriller films
2000s serial killer films
American crime thriller films
Matricide in fiction
American psychological thriller films
American serial killer films
Films scored by Philip Glass
Films about identity theft
Films based on American novels
Films based on crime novels
Films directed by D. J. Caruso
Films set in 1983
Films set in 2003
Films set in Montreal
Films set in Pennsylvania
Films shot in Montreal
American police detective films
Village Roadshow Pictures films
Warner Bros. films
2000s English-language films
2000s American films